Synendotendipes is a genus of European non-biting midges in the subfamily Chironominae of the bloodworm family Chironomidae.

Species
S. luski Grodhaus, 1987
S. abranchius (Lenz, 1955)
S. dispar (Meigen, 1830)
S. impar (Walker, 1856)
S. lepidus (Meigen, 1830)

References

Chironomidae
Diptera of Europe